Reactive & Functional Polymers is a monthly peer-reviewed scientific journal, established in 1982 and published by Elsevier. It covers research on both the science and the technology of reactive polymers (those with functional groups) including polymers and other polymers with specific chemical reactivity or other functionality. The journal publishes both original research and review papers. The editor-in-chief is Alexander Bismarck (University of Vienna).

Abstracting and indexing
The journal is abstracted and indexed in:

According to the Journal Citation Reports, the journal has a 2020 impact factor of 3.975.

References

External links

Materials science journals
Chemistry journals
Elsevier academic journals